Star Trek Into Darkness is a 2013 American science fiction film produced by Bad Robot Productions and Skydance Productions, and distributed by Paramount Pictures. It was written by Roberto Orci, Alex Kurtzman and Damon Lindelof, and was produced by J. J. Abrams and Bryan Burk in addition to the three writers. Abrams also directed the film. It is the twelfth film in the Star Trek film franchise, and a sequel to Star Trek (2009) which rebooted the series with a new cast. The film follows Captain James T. Kirk (Chris Pine) and the crew of the USS Enterprise as they seek to prevent Admiral Alexander Marcus (Peter Weller) from starting a war with the Klingon Empire, and Khan Noonien Singh (Benedict Cumberbatch) from getting his revenge on Starfleet. Star Trek Into Darkness was made on a production budget of $190 million.

The world premiere took place in Sydney, Australia on April 23, 2013. The film opened in the United States on May 16, 2013, grossing more than $70 million on the opening weekend and over $228 million during the theatrical run. Star Trek Into Darkness took more than $467 million worldwide. These takings placed the film as the second most successful Star Trek within the United States, and the most successful worldwide. Rotten Tomatoes, a review aggregator, surveyed 246 reviews and judged 87 percent to be positive.

Star Trek Into Darkness garnered 9 wins at ceremonies such as the ASCAP Film and Television Music Awards, Golden Trailer Awards and the California on Location Awards. This was out of 44 nominations, with the visual effects work on the film highlighted by the number of award nominations in this category. In addition, cast members such as Cumberbatch, Quinto and Pine were nominated for several awards, with Cumberbatch receiving the Britannia Award for British Artist of the Year. This was for the various films he appeared in during 2013, including 12 Years a Slave, August: Osage County and The Fifth Estate as well as Star Trek Into Darkness. The most nominations received were five, from the Saturn Awards, while the most wins came from the Key Art Awards were the film was awarded both a Bronze and Silver award.

Awards and nominations

See also 

 2014 in film

Notes

References

External links
 

List of accolades received by Star Trek Into Darkness
Lists of accolades by film
Lists of Star Trek awards and nominations